Koichi Fukuda (born July 1, 1975) is a Japanese musician, best known as the lead guitarist, programmer, and keyboardist for the heavy metal band Static-X; he has been a member of the band three times, initially from 1994 to 2000, again from 2005 to 2010 and since 2018. He was also the former lead guitarist of the bands Drugstore Fanatics and Bellusira.

Biography

He was present on Static-X's debut album, Wisconsin Death Trip, but left the band prior to the recording of their second album, Machine, citing personal problems due to excessive touring. However, he did still contribute keyboards to the record. He rejoined Static-X after the firing of their then-current guitarist, Tripp Eisen, at the end of the recording process of the 2005 album Start a War, and was present to record their fifth album, Cannibal.

Between his stints in Static-X, he formed another, less aggressive band called Revolve. Drawing comparisons to Tool and Pink Floyd, they were very successful locally and played several concerts in and around the Los Angeles, California area. They released several demos as free downloads on their website, and released one EP containing several reworked versions of previously released demos, as well as a few new tracks. Koichi Fukuda has a son named Naoki Fukuda, born on August 8, 2008.

On Fukuda's rejoining into the band, frontman Wayne Static said:

As of February 10, 2010, Fukuda joined Drugstore Fanatics when Static-X disbanded. 

Fukuda contributed to the KMFDM album, WTF?!, playing guitar on the song "Come On – Go Off".

Fukuda also contributed to Wednesday 13's 2011 Remix EP, "Re-Animated". The tracks from the EP were re-released as part of Disc 4 for Wednesday's "Dead Meat: 10 Years of Blood, Feathers & Lipstick" box set under the Disc title: "Re-Animated Resurrected". The disc also featured extra remixes by Koichi.

In 2015, Fukuda was in the Australian rock band Bellusira, working out of Los Angeles.

On October 23, 2018, it was announced that Fukuda – along with the other two surviving original members, bassist Tony Campos and drummer Ken Jay – would be involved in a reunion of Static-X, who were planning to release a new album and tour in 2019 in honor of the memory of their former bandmate Wayne Static. The first of those albums, which had since been announced as being split into two parts, titled Project Regeneration Vol. 1, was released on July 10, 2020.

Equipment
ESP Guitars and Ibanez Guitars (particularly favoring the RGR models, with reverse headstock)
Fernandes Monterey Deluxe and Revolver Elite Ltd.
EMG 60AX, 81X, 89X, SAX, EXG, and SPC pickups and tone controls
Seymour Duncan Distortion and Custom bridge pickups, with a Cool Rails in the neck position.
Hughes & Kettner Switchblade heads.
Digitech GSP-1101 effects unit.
Electro-Voice digital wireless system. (the same one Wayne Static used)

References

External links 
Official Static-X website
Interview with Ultimate Guitar along with Wayne Static

1975 births
Heavy metal keyboardists
Industrial metal musicians
Japanese rock guitarists
Japanese heavy metal guitarists
Japanese expatriates in the United States
Lead guitarists
Living people
Male guitarists
Musicians from Osaka Prefecture
People from Kawachinagano
Static-X members
21st-century Japanese male musicians
20th-century Japanese guitarists
21st-century Japanese guitarists